Veteranendag (Veterans' Day) is the Netherlands' annual day of remembrance for the country's servicemen. Since 2005 it has been organized on the birthday of the late Prince Bernhard. It is held on the last Saturday of June.

References

June observances
Military of the Netherlands
Netherlands